Ariful Haque Choudhury is a Bangladesh Nationalist Party politician and the current mayor of Sylhet. Choudhury is also an executive member of Bangladesh Nationalist Party. In 2003, he was elected as commissioner of Sylhet City Corporation. He become Mayor for consecutive 2 terms since 2013.

Career 
Ariful Hoque Choudhury surrendered to joint forces on 25 February 2007 in Sylhet after emergency law was declared in Bangladesh. He was a ward commissioner of Sylhet City Corporation. He was also the chief of development committee of Sylhet City Corporation. On 19 June 2007, Haji Dilar Ahmed, a contractor, sued Choudhury for extorting 1.5 million taka from him over awarding a contract for road construction with Kotwali Police Station. Anti-Corruption Commission sued Choudhury for accumulating 26.3 million taka in illegal wealth through corruption with Sylhet Police Station on 9 September 2007.

Choudhury is a former President of Bangladesh Nationalist Party Sylhet unit. He and his wife, Shyama Haque Chowdhury, was sued on 5 March 2008 by Anti-Corruption Commission. He was accused of accumulating 25 million taka in illegal wealth through corruption. On 23 June 2008, he was sentenced to 10 years imprisonment over the case. His wife was sentenced to three years imprisonment in the case.

On 9 April 2013, Choudhury was acquitted on the corruption case filled by Anti-Corruption Commission.

Choudhury became the mayor of Sylhet city by defeating Badar Uddin Ahmed Kamran in June 2013. Arif won the election by more than 35,000 votes.

Choudhury was a follower of Saifur Rahman, former Finance Minister of Bangladesh and Member of Parliament from Sylhet-1. After his win, he completed the Saifur Rahman Shishu Park in Sylhet and sent it for approval to the relevant ministry. The approval was refused as the Awami League government were not keen to open a park named after a Bangladesh Nationalist Party leader. He tried to open it under two different names, 'Sylhet Natural Park' and 'Dakshin Surma Park', but was still refused permission by the government. The government of Bangladesh renamed the park to 'Jananetri Sheikh Hasina Shishu Park' and announced it will be opened soon in 2021.

On 13 November 2014, Bangladesh Police added him to a supplementary charge sheet they filled over the Shah A M S Kibria murder case from 2005. The new charge sheet also included GK Gaus, Mayor of Habiganj, and Harris Chowdhury, former political secretary to Khaleda Zia.  He was arrested after surrendered to the court on this case on 30 December 2014.

On 7 January 2015, Choudhury was suspended by Ministry of Local Government, Rural Development and Co-operatives from his post of mayor after being charged in the Shah A M S Kibria murder case. He was then sacked from his post.

Choudhury had his acquittal verdict on the corruption charges scrapped by Bangladesh Supreme Court on 15 January 2016. On 27 March 2016, Choudhury received bail on the Shah A M S Kibria murder case.

Choudhury was released from Sylhet Central Jail after receiving bail from Bangladesh Supreme Court on 5 January 2017 which upheld his bail order issued by Bangladesh High Court on 11 December 2016. On 13 March 2017, Bangladesh High Court issued a stay order on Choudhury's suspension from the post of Mayor of Sylhet. A bench of Bangladesh Supreme Court, Appellate Division led by Justice Surendra Kumar Sinha agreed with the High Court order and announced that there was no restriction on Choudhury resuming his office on 23 March 2017. Choudhury was suspended from his post of mayor of Sylhet by Ministry of Local Government, Rural Development and Co-operatives on 2 April 2017. The Ministry also suspended Mosaddek Hossain Bulbul, mayor of Rajshahi and also a Bangladesh Nationalist Party politician.

Choudhury was nominated by Bangladesh Nationalist Party to contest the 2018 mayoral election in Sylhet. He protested outside the office of deputy commissioner of Sylhet Metropolitan Police over the arrest of Bangladesh Nationalist Party activists who were campaigning on his re-election. He was re-elected mayor of Sylhet on 12 August 2018. He beat the Awami League candidate Badar Uddin Ahmed Kamran by  6,196 votes. He had also faced a rebel candidate, Badruzzaman Selim, of Bangladesh Nationalist Party and another candidate, Ehsanul Mahbub Jubayer, from Bangladesh Jamaat-e-Islami. Foyzul Haque Raju, an activist of Bangladesh Jatiotabadi Chatra Dal, died in fractional clashes near Choudhury's home after celebrating his election victory that day. He was sworn in on 5 September 2018 by Prime Minister Sheikh Hasina.

On 28 August 2018, Bangladesh High Court ordered Bangladesh government to handover Choudhury's passport to him. The passport was confiscated after he had received bail from Shah A M S Kibria murder case.

In August 2019, Choudhury announced a 7.89 billion taka budget, including 2 billion taka allocation for infrastructure project from Bangladesh government, for Sylhet City Corporation. On 28 September 2019, Choudhury filed a general diary with Kotwali Police Station over threats he received on the phone.

22 councillors of Sylhet City Corporation out of a total 36 councillors filled a complaint against Choudhury with Ministry of Local Government, Rural Development and Co-operatives over corruption allegation and called for his removal. Some of the councillors would later tell the press that they did not call for his removal but for an investigation of specific corruption allegation against him. On 10 September 2020, Choudhury tested positive for COVID-19 during the COVID-19 pandemic in Bangladesh. His wife had tested positive in June 2020 and recovered at home.

References

Living people
People from Sylhet
1959 births
Mayors of Sylhet
Bangladesh Nationalist Party politicians